Limbadi is a comune (municipality) in the Province of Vibo Valentia in the Italian region Calabria, located about  southwest of Catanzaro and about  southwest of Vibo Valentia.

The municipality of Limbadi contains the frazioni (subdivisions, mainly villages and hamlets) Badia di Limbadi, Caroni, Mandaradoni, Motta Filocastro, and San Nicola De Legistis.

Limbadi borders the following municipalities: Candidoni, Nicotera, Rombiolo, San Calogero, Spilinga.

Demographic evolution

References

Cities and towns in Calabria